"Dollaz on My Head" (stylized in all caps) is a song by American rapper Gunna featuring fellow American rapper Young Thug. Produced by Mike Will Made It and Myles Harris , it was sent to rhythmic contemporary radio on July 6, 2020 as the third single from Gunna's second studio album Wunna (2020).

Chart performance
Dollaz on My Head debuted and peaked at number 38 on the US Billboard Hot 100 chart, on the week of June 6, 2020. This became Gunna's eighth top 40 hit and his highest charting song from the album "Wunna". The song debuted on the chart with 12 other songs from "Wunna" On April 16, 2021, the song was certified platinum by the Recording Industry Association of America (RIAA) for combined sales and streaming equivalent units of over one million units in the United States.

Music video 
The music video premiered on July 24, 2020 via YouTube. Directed by Spike Jordan and Maxime Quoilin, it starts off with Gunna, who is playing golf on the balcony of his mansion, calling Young Thug through FaceTime. His game is then interrupted by a family wishing to welcome him into their neighborhood. He invites them in, and the family is surprised by the luxury of his house.

Charts

Weekly charts

Year-end charts

Certifications

References 

2020 singles
2020 songs
Gunna (rapper) songs
Songs written by Gunna (rapper)
Young Thug songs
Songs written by Young Thug
Songs written by Mike Will Made It
Song recordings produced by Mike Will Made It
300 Entertainment singles